PerperiyanKuppam (PPK), also known as Kallodaavi among neighboring peoples, is a village in Panruti, in the western end of Cuddalore District of Tamil Nadu State, India.

Demographics
, the population is around 2000, 1200 of them have voting rights. There is an old Shivan temple in perperiyankuppm,There is a  Pond  near to the temple, which also serves as  main water source for perperiyankuppam and the neighbor villages during summer time. Temple is 700 years old.

Education
There are five schools in PerperiyanKuppam, three of which are government schools and two private-owned.
 Government Boys Higher Secondary School
 Government Girls Higher Secondary School
 Elementary School
 Kaliyaperumal Matric School
 Rajarajan Matric School

Health care
There is one Tamil Nadu government run primary health center, and a few small private health care centers.

Business in PPK
Because the cashew nut is the main agricultural product in PPK, many people do cashew-related business.
Few people are working in Neyveli Lignite Corporation and few are doing wood related business.

Political structure
MLA:  SABA.RAJENDIRAN (DMK)

MLA constituency: Neyveli

MP: A. Arunmozhithevan (AIADMK)

MP constituency:  Cuddalore

President of Perperiyankuppam village panchayat:  Poonguzhali Devasenathipathi

Police open fire
Vilolence

References

External links
PPK Wiki map

Villages in Cuddalore district